Kijima (written: ,  or) is a Japanese surname. Notable people with the surname include:

Ai Kijima (born 1970), Japanese artist
, Japanese serial killer
, Japanese general
, Japanese academic
, Japanese samurai
, Japanese gravure idol and actress
, Japanese footballer
, Japanese voice actor
, Japanese photographer
, Japanese footballer
, Japanese footballer

Japanese-language surnames